Cao Xuan (Chinese: 曹轩; born July 2, 1985) is a Chinese footballer.

Club career
Cao Xuan originally started his football career with the Dalian Shide F.C. youth team, however in 2000 he would move to Zhejiang so he could join and play for the Zhejiang Lücheng youth team. With them he would graduate to the senior team and start his professional football career at the bottom the Chinese league system, however after several seasons with the club he would see finally promoted to the Chinese Super League after seeing Zhejiang Lücheng come second in the second tier. He would be a vital member of the team to help establish the club as mid-table regulars for several seasons until the 2009 Chinese Super League saw the club struggle within the league, this saw Chinese international Du Wei brought in the following season to strengthen the team's defense and Cao would be dropped as a squad regular. When Du Wei left, Cao would re-establish himself as a vital member of the team's defence.

On 5 January 2016, Cao transferred to his hometown club Dalian Yifang in the China League One. He was excluded from the team squad in the 2017 season under manager Juan Ramón López Caro. Cao joined fellow League One side Shijiazhuang Ever Bright on 26 January 2018. By the following 2019 league season he would help the team win promotion back into the top tier.

Career statistics
Statistics accurate as of match played 31 December 2020.

Honours

Club
Dalian Yifang
China League One: 2017

References

External links
Player profile  at sodasoccer.com
Player stats at sohu.com
 

1985 births
Living people
Chinese footballers
Footballers from Dalian
Zhejiang Professional F.C. players
Dalian Professional F.C. players
Cangzhou Mighty Lions F.C. players
Chinese Super League players
China League One players
Association football defenders
21st-century Chinese people